The women's +75 kilograms weightlifting event was the heaviest women's event at the weightlifting competition, allowing competitors with over 75 kilograms of body mass. The competition took place on August 16, starting at 19:00.

Each lifter performed in both the snatch and clean and jerk lifts, with the final score being the sum of the lifter's best result in each. The athlete received three attempts in each of the two lifts; the score for the lift was the heaviest weight successfully lifted.

The winner of the event, Jang Mi-ran, broke three world records: the snatch (140 kg, +1 kg), the clean and jerk (186 kg, +4 kg) and the total (326 kg, +7 kg). With the disqualification of Olha Korobka and Mariya Grabovetskaya, Jang won the competition by 57kg, an Olympic record margin.

Schedule
All times are China Standard Time (UTC+08:00)

Records

Results

 Olha Korobka of Ukraine and Mariya Grabovetskaya of Kazakhstan originally finished second and third, respectively. But were both disqualified after they tested positive for dehydrochlormethyltestosterone and Oxandrolone.

New records

References

 Page 2647

Weightlifting at the 2008 Summer Olympics
Women's events at the 2008 Summer Olympics
Olymp